Kellyn Lillian Plasschaert (November 26, 1958–April 30, 2009) was an American actress born in Los Angeles, California and the daughter of Alex Edward Plasschaert, a stuntman and choreographer.  She was the hostess of the children's television series Mousercise. Her residence was in Canyon Country, California. Kellyn died from cancer on April 30, 2009. She was cremated.

Filmography

References

External links
 Kellyn Plasschaert at IMDB
 Kellyn Plasschaert at Find A Grave

American television actresses
American exercise instructors
1958 births
2009 deaths
Actresses from Los Angeles
People from Canyon Country, Santa Clarita, California
20th-century American actresses
21st-century American women